Saint-Viâtre is a commune in the Loir-et-Cher department in central France.

History
The village was originally called Tremblevif, from the Latin for "aspen" and "village", but suggesting in the popular imagination a place prone to swamp fever and trembling limbs. In 1854, worried that outsiders might be put off, the villagers successfully petitioned to change the name to Saint-Viâtre  in honour of a hermit, traditionally known as Viâtre, who had lived in the forests of Sologne. His tomb is in the crypt of the village church.

Population

See also
Communes of the Loir-et-Cher department

References

Communes of Loir-et-Cher